United Air Lines Flight 608 was a Douglas DC-6 airliner, registration NC37510, on a scheduled passenger flight from Los Angeles to Chicago when it crashed at 12:29 pm on October 24, 1947 about  southeast of Bryce Canyon Airport, Utah, United States. None of the five crew members and 47 passengers on board survived. It was the first crash of a DC-6, and at the time, it was the second-deadliest air crash in the United States, surpassed by Eastern Air Lines Flight 605 by only one fatality.

Accident sequence
United Flight 608 departed from Los Angeles, California, at 10:23 am on a routine flight to Chicago, Illinois. At 12:21 pm, the airplane's pilot, Captain Everett L. McMillen, radioed that a fire was in the baggage compartment, which they could not control, with smoke entering the passenger cabin. The flight requested an emergency clearance to Bryce Canyon Airport, Utah, which was granted.

As it descended, pieces of the airplane, including portions of the right wing, started to fall off, and one of the emergency flares on the wing ignited. At 12:27 pm, the last radio transmission was heard from the airplane: "We may make it – approaching a strip."

Ground observers reported that occupants of the airliner, prior to the impact, were throwing various items out of the cabin door in an attempt to lighten the load as the DC-6 descended over the canyon. The airliner crashed onto National Park Service land, killing all 52 passengers and crew on board.

The October 25, 1947, edition of the Bridgeport Post reported:

Cause of the crash
Just over three weeks later, on November 11, 1947, a similar in-flight incident almost claimed a second commercial DC-6 airliner.

An American Airlines DC-6 (NC90741), on a flight from San Francisco to Chicago with 25 crew and passengers aboard, reported an on-board fire over Arizona and managed to make an emergency landing in flames at the airport at Gallup, New Mexico. All 25 occupants escaped the burning plane, and the fire was extinguished. Unlike the Bryce Canyon crash a month earlier, investigators now had a damaged, but intact aircraft to examine and study.

The cause of both the Bryce Canyon crash and the near-fatal Gallup incident was eventually traced to a design flaw. A cabin heater intake scoop was positioned too close to the number 3 alternate fuel tank air vent. If flight crews allowed a fuel tank to be overfilled during a routine fuel transfer between wing tanks, it could lead to several gallons of excess fuel flowing out of the tank vent and then being sucked into the cabin heater system, which then ignited the fuel. This caused the fire that destroyed the United aircraft at Bryce Canyon and severely damaged the American aircraft that landed in flames at Gallup.

In the Bryce Canyon crash, the Civil Aeronautics Board found the causes to be the design flaw, inadequate training of the crew about the danger, and the failure of the crew to halt the fuel transfer before the tank overflowed.

Aftermath
The aircraft wreckage was loaded onto trucks and moved to Douglas Aircraft Company in California, where the airplane was reassembled in an effort to determine the cause of the crash.

As a result of the disaster, the entire fleet of 80 Douglas DC-6 aircraft, including the U.S. President's aircraft (which was a sister ship), were ordered grounded and recalled. Design changes that were made thereafter still stand today.

See also
 Aviation safety
 List of accidents and incidents involving commercial aircraft

References

External links

 Report from the Civil Aeronautics Board – PDF
 "October 24, 1947, United Air Lines Inc., Douglas DC-6 (NC37510) Bryce Canyon, UT", lostflights.com – photo gallery
 Various articles from The Deseret News, October 25, 1947
 "Sending blind", Time Magazine, November 3, 1947
 "Bryce Canyon, UT Plane Smashes Into Plateau, Oct 1947", gendisasters.com

Aviation accidents and incidents in the United States in 1947
1947 in Utah
Airliner accidents and incidents in Utah
Airliner accidents and incidents caused by in-flight fires
608
Disasters in Utah
Accidents and incidents involving the Douglas DC-6
Garfield County, Utah
October 1947 events in the United States
Bryce Canyon National Park